Stéphanie Bouvier (born 15 November 1981) is a short track speed-skater. She represented France at the 2006 Winter Olympics and France at the 2010 Winter Olympics.

References 

1981 births
Living people
French female short track speed skaters
Olympic short track speed skaters of France
Short track speed skaters at the 2006 Winter Olympics
Short track speed skaters at the 2010 Winter Olympics
Universiade medalists in short track speed skating
World Short Track Speed Skating Championships medalists
Sportspeople from Dijon
Universiade bronze medalists for France
Competitors at the 2005 Winter Universiade
21st-century French women